Ogren may refer to:

People:
Robert E. Ogren (1922–2005), American zoologist
Ryan Ogren, American singer-songwriter 
Paul Anders Ogren (born 1951), American carpenter, farmer, and politician
Sandra Gardebring Ogren (1947– 2010) American jurist, Associate Justice of the Minnesota Supreme Court

Other:
Ogren (automobile company)